Townsville CBD has many heritage-listed sites, including:

 Castle Hill Road: Castle Hill
 2-4 Cleveland Terrace: Drystone Wall, Melton Hill
 20 Cleveland Terrace: The Rocks Guesthouse
 26 Cleveland Terrace: Warringa
 36 Cleveland Terrace: St James Cathedral
 36 Cleveland Terrace: Synod Hall
 Clifton Street: Australian Institute of Tropical Medicine Building
 87 Flinders Street: Tattersalls Hotel
 101-111 Flinders Street: Bank of New South Wales
 104-106 Flinders Street: Queensland Building
 108-124 Flinders Street: Burns Philp Building
 143-149 Flinders Street East: First AMP Building (later Magnetic House)
 173 Flinders Street: Australian Joint Stock Bank Building
 175 Flinders Street: Queens Building
 181-183 Flinders Street: Atkinson & Powell Building
 193 Flinders Street: T. Willmetts & Sons Printery
 197-203 Flinders Street: Stanton House
 205-207 Flinders Street: former Commercial Bank of Australia Building (Atinee Building)
 212-260 Stanley Street: Block A, Townsville Technical College
 221-223 Flinders Street: Clayton's Apothecaries' Hall
 224 Flinders Street: Howard Smith Company Building (later Agora House)
 232-234 Flinders Street: Aplin Brown & Company Building
 241 - 245 Flinders Street: Rooney Building
 247 Flinders Street: Samuel Allen & Sons Building
 252-270 Flinders Street: former Townsville Post Office (now The Brewery)
 253-259 Flinders Street: Perc Tucker Regional Gallery
 272-278 Flinders Street: Commonwealth Bank Building
 295-303 Flinders Street: Queensland National Bank
 337-343 Flinders Street: Westpac Bank
 408-410 Flinders Street: Henlein & Co Building
 416-418 Flinders Street: Second AMP Building
 419 Flinders Street: State Government Offices (Flinders Street)
 500 Flinders Street: Great Northern Hotel
 502 & 792 Flinders Street: Old Townsville railway station
 719-741 Flinders Street: Lion Brewery
 799 Flinders Street: Saints Theodores Greek Orthodox Church
 21 Lawson Street: Rosebank House
 Stanley Street: Townsville School of Arts
 266 Stanley Street: Sacred Heart Cathedral
 Stokes Street: Victoria Bridge
 The Strand: Anzac Memorial Park
 The Strand: Queen's Hotel
 The Strand: Tobruk Memorial Baths
 1-13 Sturt Street: Dalgety Offices
 35 Sturt Street: Osler House
 42 Sturt Street: Commonwealth Offices
 81 Sturt Street: former Townsville Magistrates Court
 485 Sturt Street: Townsville Masonic Hall
 513 Sturt Street: Townsville Baptist Church
 Wickham Street: Townsville Customs House
 12-14 Wickham Street: State Government Offices (Wickham Street)

References

Historical sites in Queensland
Townsville City
Townsville
Lists of tourist attractions in Queensland
Queensland Heritage Register sites located in Townsville